The Diocese of Scala is a titular see of the Catholic Church, currently held by Archbishop Edward Joseph Adams, Apostolic Nuncio to Great Britain. 

It was established in 987 as a regular diocese with its cathedra (seat) in Scala on the Amalfi Coast of Italy. On 31 July 1603 it merged aeque principaliter (Latin for "equally important") with the diocese of Ravello. On 27 June 1818 the Diocese of Ravello and Scala was suppressed by Pope Pius VII and all its territory was incorporated into the Archdiocese of Amalfi, now the Archdiocese of Amalfi-Cava de' Tirreni.

In 1968 it was established as a titular see and has been held by auxiliary bishops and papal nuncios since then.

History

According to tradition, it was founded in the 4th century AD by a group of shipwrecked Romans trying to make their way to Constantinople. A fortified bulwark, Scala was part of the defensive system of the territory of Amalfi. Its history is closely related to that of the Marine Republic of Amalfi. It was a bishopric from 987 to 1818. In 1073 during the Norman conquest of southern Italy, after a strong siege, Scala was burned by Robert Guiscard. Soon after, it was sacked by the Pisans, by Ottone Brunswich (1210), and by the Sicilians (1283).

With more than a thousand-year history, Scala during the height of its economic splendor had about 130 churches. It is also noted as the birthplace of Gerard Thom (Gerardo de Saxo), the founder of the Order of the Knights of St. John of Jerusalem, or the Knights Hospitaller.

Former cathedral
The cathedral of the diocese, dedicated to Saint Lawrence, was built in its original form during the 12th century in Romanesque style. It was modified in the 17th and 18th centuries, preserving only the original structure of the portal. The interior is in the form of a nave and two aisles, with high-quality stuccoes and a vault decorated with scenes from the saint's life (1748).

In the Gothic-style crypt is the colored stucco sarcophagus of Marinella Rufolo with a group of 14th-century wooden statues and other sculptures carved by her widower, Antonio Coppola, in 1332.

List of holders

Diocesan bishops
 Sergio (987 - ?)
 Alessandro (1118 - ?)
 Orso D'Afflitto (1144 - ?)
 Alessandro II (1171 - after 1191)
 Costantino D'Afflitto (1207 - after 1223)
 Matteo D'Afflitto (1227–1269)
 An anonymous bishop (mentioned in 1313)
 Teodoro Scacciavento (1328 - ?)
 Guglielmo Lombardo, O.P. (c. 1335 - 1342)
 Guglielmo II, O.F.M. (1342 - 1349)
 Giacomo Sazali, O.P. (23 June 1349 - 1369)
 Guillaume Vaysserie, O.P. (7 August 1384 - ?) (anti-bishop)
 Andrea Fusco (January 1390 - 29 May 1397 - transferred to Ravello)
 Pietro (c. 1394  - 1395 - transferred to Termoli)
 Petruccio da Penne, O.P. (1 December 1395 - 1418)
 Natale Mastini D'Afflitto (23 November 1418 - 1450)
 Evangelista Frioli, Bethlehemites (31 July 1450 - 1465)
 Matteo Doti (20 February 1469 - 1499)
 Giacomo Pisanelli (13 January 1500 - 1511)
 Ferdinando de Castro (17 September 1511 - 1515)
 Baltasar del Río (22 October 1515 - 1 January 1540)
 Lodovico Vanino de Theodoli, Canons Regular of Saint Augustine (19 January 1541 - 7 May 1548 - transferred to Bertinoro)
 Gaspare Ricciullo del Fosso, O.M. (17 May 1548 - 22 April 1551 - transferred to Calvi)
 Alfonso Romero, O.F.M. (10 July 1551 - 1551) (Bishop Elect)
 Costantino Piccioni, Order of Saint Augustine (27 April 1552 - 25 February 1577 - transferred to Cortona)
 Feliciano Ninguarda, O.P. (25 February 1577 - 31 January 1583 - transferred to Sant'Agata de' Goti)
 Francesco D'Afflitto (27 June 1583 - 11 October 1593)
 Giovanni Battista Serignano, O.P. (7 January 1594 - October 1594)
 Floriano Nanni, Canons Regular of the Lateran (7 November 1594 - 19 September 1598)
 Francesco Bennio De Butrio, O.S.M. (25 November 1598 - 31 July 1603 - transferred to Ravello and Scala)

Titular bishops
 Joseph Alphonse McNicholas (31 January 1969 - 22 July 1975 - became bishop of Springfield in Illinois)
 João Alves (5 September 1975 - 8 September 1976 - became bishop of Coimbra)
 Marion Francis Forst (16 October 1976 - 23 December 1986)
 George Pell (30 March 1987 - 16 July 1996 - became archbishop of Melbourne)
 Edward Joseph Adams, Apostolic Nuncio to United Kingdom of Great Britain, with personal title of Archbishop (since 24 August 1996)

References

External links
 
 
 Titular Episcopal See of Scala on gcatholic.org

Former Roman Catholic dioceses in Italy
Catholic titular sees in Europe